The state of Arkansas has a wide variety of freshwater fish species in its rivers, lakes, and streams.

Sport

Black bass
Order: Perciformes – Family: Centrarchidae
Native species
Largemouth bass, Micropterus salmoides
Smallmouth bass, Micropterus dolomieu
Spotted bass, Micropterus punctulatus

Carps
Order: Cypriniformes – Family: Cyprinidae
Non-native, exotic species
Bighead carp, Hypophthalmichthys nobilis
Common carp, Cyprinus carpio
Grass carp, Ctenopharyngodon idella
Silver carp, Hypophthalmichthys molitrix

North American catfish
Order: Siluriformes – Family: Ictaluridae
Native species
Blue catfish, Ictalurus furcatus
Channel catfish, Ictalurus punctatus
Flathead catfish, Pylodictis olivaris

Pikes
Order: Esociformes – Family: Esocidae
Native species
Chain pickerel, Esox niger
American pickerel, Esox americanus vermiculatus
Non-native, exotic species
Muskellunge, Esox masquinongy
Northern pike, Esox lucius

Sunfishes
Order: Perciformes – Family: Centrarchidae
Native species
Bluegill, Lepomis macrochirus
Green sunfish, Lepomis cyanellus
Longear sunfish, Lepomis megalotus
Flier, Centrarchus macropterus
Redear sunfish, Lepomis microlophus
Orangespotted sunfish, Lepomis humilis
Warmouth, Lepomis gulosus
Redspotted sunfish, Lepomis miniatus
Black crappie, Pomoxis nigromaculatus
White crappie, Pomoxis annularis

Temperate bass
Order: Perciformes – Family: Moronidae
Native species
White bass, Morone chrysops
Yellow bass, Morone mississippiensis
Non-native, exotic species
Striped bass, Morone saxatilis
Hybrid striped bass, Morone chrysops × Morone saxatilis

Trouts
Order: Salmoniformes, Family: Salmonidae
Non-native, exotic species
Brook trout, Salvelinus fontinalis
Brown trout, Salmo trutta
Cutthroat trout, Oncorhynchus clarkii
Lake trout, Salvelinus namaycush
Rainbow trout, Oncorhynchus mykiss
Tiger trout, Salmo trutta × Salvelinus fontinalis

Non-sport

Bowfin
Order: Amiiformes, Family: Amiidae
Native species
Bowfin, Amia calva

In Arkansas, the bowfin is typically known as grinnel.

Gars
Order: Lepisosteiformes, Family: Lepisosteidae
Native species
Alligator gar, Atractosteus spatula
Spotted gar, Lepisosteus oculatus
Longnose gar, Lepisosteus osseus
Shortnose gar, Lepisosteus platostomus

Minnows
Order: Cypriniformes, Family: Cyprinidae
Native species
Bigeye chub, Hybopsis amblops
Bigeye shiner, Notropis boops
Blackspot shiner, Notropis atrocaudalis
Blacktail shiner, Cyprinella venusta
Bluehead shiner, Notropis hubbsi
Bluntface shiner, Notropis camurus
Cardinal shiner, Luxilus cardinalis
Cypress minnow, Hybognathus hayi
Duskystripe shiner, Luxilus pilsbryi
Emerald shiner, Notropis atherinoides
Finescale stoneroller, Campostoma pullum
Flathead chub, Hybopsis gracilis
Ghost shiner, Notropis buchanani
Golden shiner, Notemigonus crysoleucas
Gravel chub, Hybopsis x-punctata
Highland stoneroller, Campostoma spadiceum
Hornyhead chub, Nocomis biguttatus
Ironcolor shiner, Notropis chalybaeus
Largescale stoneroller, Campostoma oligolepis
Mississippi silvery minnow, Hybognathus nuchalis
Ozark chub, Erimystax harryi
Pallid shiner, Notropis amnis
Plains minnow, hybognathus placitus
Plains stoneroller, Campostoma plumbeum
Pugnose minnow, Notropis emiliae
Red River shiner, Notropis bairdi
Red shiner, Cyprinella lutrensis
Redspot chub, Nocomis asper
River shiner, Notropis blennius
Sicklefin chub, Hybopsis meeki
Silver chub, Hybopsis storeriana
Southern redbelly dace, Chrosomus erythrogaster
Speckled chub, Hybopsis aestivalis
Spotfin shiner, Cyprinella spiloptera
Steelcolor shiner, Cyprinella whipplei
Streamline chub, Hybopsis dissimilis
Striped shiner, Luxilus chrysocephalus
Sturgeon chub, Hybopsis gelida
Whitetail shiner, Notropis galactura
Non-native, exotic species
Goldfish, Carassius auratus

Order: Cypriniformes, Family: Leuciscidae
Native species
Arkansas River shiner, Notropis girardi
Central stoneroller, Campostoma anomalum
Chub shiner, Notropis potteri
Kiamichi shiner, Notropis ortenburgeri
Mimic shiner, Notropis volucellus
Ozark minnow, Notropis nubilus
Ozark shiner, Notropis ozarcanus
Ouachita mountain shiner, Lythrurus snelsoni
Peppered shiner, Notropis perpallidus
Redfin shiner, Lythrurus umbratilis
Ribbon shiner, Notropis fumeus
Rosyface shiner, Notropis rubellus
Sand shiner, Notropis stramineus
Sabine shiner, Notropis sabinae
Silverband shiner, Notropis shumardi
Taillight shiner, Notropis maculatus
Telescope shiner, Notropis telescopus
Wedgespot shiner, Notropis greenei
Weed shiner, Notropis texanus

Paddlefish
Order: Acipenseriformes, Family: Polyodontidae
Native species
American paddlefish, Polydon spathula

Sturgeons
Order: Acipenseriformes, Family: Acipenseridae
Native species
Lake sturgeon, Acipenser fulvescens
Atlantic sturgeon, Acipenser oxyrinchus
Pallid sturgeon, Scaphirhynchus albus
Shovelnose sturgeon, Scaphirhynchus platorynchus

The three types of sturgeon native to Arkansas are uncommon, and two of the species are listed as endangered nationwide. The lake sturgeon is near the southern end of its range in Arkansas, more commonly found in the Upper Midwest. Pallid and shovelnose sturgeon live in large, turbid rivers of the Mississippi Alluvial Plain, including the lower Arkansas, Mississippi, and lower White rivers downstream of impoundments.

Eels
Order: Anguilliformes, Family: Anguillidae
 Native species
 American eel, Anguilla rostrata

Herrings
Order: Clupeiformes, Family: Clupeidae
 Native species
 Alabama shad, Alosa alabamae
 Skipjack herring, Alosa chrysochloris
 Gizzard shad, dorosoma cepedianum
 Threadfin shad, dorosoma petenense

Lampreys
Order: Petromyzontiformes, Family: Petromyzontidae
 Native species
 Chestnut lamprey, ichthyomyzon castaneus
 Southern brook lamprey, ichthyomyzon gagei
 Silver lamprey, ichthyomyzon unicuspis
 Least brook lamprey, lampetra aepyptera
 American brook lamprey, lenthenteron appendix
 Non-native, exotic species
 Sea lamprey, petromyzon marinus

Mudminnow
Order: Esociformes, Family: Umbridae
 Native species
 Central mudminnow, umbra limi

Smelts
Order: Osmeriformes, Family: Osmeridae

 Native species
 Rainbow smelt, osmerus mordax

Mooneyes
Order: Hiodontiformes, Family: Hiodontidae

 Native species
 Goldeye, hiodon alosoides
 Mooneye, hiodon tergisus

See also

List of Arkansas Wildlife Management Areas
Water in Arkansas

References

Fishes
Arkansas
Arkansas
Arkansas
Natural history of Arkansas